Leydig cell hypoplasia (or aplasia) (LCH), also known as Leydig cell agenesis, is a rare autosomal recessive genetic and endocrine syndrome affecting an estimated 1 in 1,000,000 genetic males. It is characterized by an inability of the body to respond to luteinizing hormone (LH), a gonadotropin which is normally responsible for signaling Leydig cells of the testicles to produce testosterone and other androgen sex hormones. The condition manifests itself as pseudohermaphroditism (partially or fully underdeveloped genitalia), hypergonadotropic hypogonadism (decreased or lack of production of sex steroids by the gonads despite high circulating levels of gonadotropins), reduced or absent puberty (lack of development of secondary sexual characteristics, resulting in sexual infantilism if left untreated), and infertility.

Leydig cell hypoplasia does not occur in biological females as they do not have either Leydig cells or testicles. However, the cause of the condition in males, luteinizing hormone insensitivity, does affect females, and because LH plays a role in the female reproductive system, it can result in primary amenorrhea or oligomenorrhea (absent or reduced menstruation), infertility due to anovulation, and ovarian cysts.

A related condition is follicle-stimulating hormone (FSH) insensitivity, which presents with similar symptoms to those of Leydig cell hypoplasia but with the symptoms in the respective sexes reversed (i.e., hypogonadism and sexual infantilism in females and merely problems with fertility in males). Despite their similar causes, FSH insensitivity is considerably less common in comparison to LH insensitivity.

Symptoms and signs
The symptoms of Leydig cell hypoplasia include pseudohermaphroditism, i.e., feminized, ambiguous, or relatively mildly underdeveloped (e.g., micropenis, severe hypospadias, and/or cryptorchidism [undescended testes]) external genitalia, a female gender identity or gender variance, hypergonadotropic hypogonadism (hypogonadism despite high levels of gonadotropins), delayed, impaired, or fully absent puberty with an associated reduction in or complete lack of development of secondary sexual characteristics (sexual infantilism), impaired fertility or complete sterility, tall stature (due to delayed epiphyseal closure), eunuchoid skeletal proportions, delayed or absent bone maturation, and osteoporosis.

Cause

Leydig cell hypoplasia is caused by genetic mutations in LHCGR, a gene which encodes the LH/hCG receptor. LH normally acts through the LH/hCG receptor to stimulate the growth of Leydig cells in the testicles and the production of androgens such as testosterone and dihydrotestosterone (DHT) by these cells. In Leydig cell hypoplasia however, there is a reduced capacity for the LH/hCG receptor to respond to LH. This results in hypoplasia or absence of Leydig cells, testicular atrophy, and lower than normal androgen levels. In the most severe form of the condition in which there is a complete lack of response of the Leydig cells to LH, androgen production by the testicles is virtually negligible and secondary sexual characteristics entirely fail to develop at puberty.

Diagnosis
Since the Sertoli cells are not affected by Leydig cell hypoplasia, anti-Müllerian hormone is secreted normally and so there are no Müllerian structures. Wolffian structures, such as the prostate, vasa deferentia, and epidydimides are present. In type I, abdominal testes are revealed on ultrasound; in type II testes may be descended or undescended.

People with Leydig cell hypoplasia type I display no response to the hCG stimulation test; there is no increase in serum levels of testosterone and dihydrotestosterone. Leydig cell hypoplasia type II can display either a pronounced rise of testosterone levels or no rise. 

In any case, the diagnosis is confirmed on biopsy of the testes, revealing either absent or hypoplastic Leydig cells. The inside of the testis will be grayish and mucous, displaying arrested spermatogenesis and the presence of Sertoli cells. The diagnosis can also be confirmed by looking for mutations in the gene for the LH receptor.

A diagnosis of Leydig cell hypoplasia is usually made in the neonatal period, following the discovery of ambiguous genitalia, or at puberty, when secondary sex characteristics fail to develop. Puberty is the most common time for Leydig cell hypoplasia to be diagnosed.

Treatment
Patients with Leydig cell hypoplasia may be treated with hormone replacement therapy (i.e., with androgens), which will result in normal sexual development and the resolution of most symptoms. In the case of 46,XY (genetically "male") individuals who are phenotypically female and/or identify as the female gender, estrogens should be given instead. Surgical correction of the genitals in 46,XY males may be required, and, if necessary, an orchidopexy (relocation of the undescended testes to the scrotum) may be performed as well.

See also
 Disorders of sex development
 Intersexuality, pseudohermaphroditism, and ambiguous genitalia
 Hypogonadism and hypogonadotropic hypogonadism
 Familial male-limited precocious puberty (or LH oversensitivity)
 Follicle-stimulating hormone insensitivity
 Gonadotropin-releasing hormone insensitivity
 Inborn errors of steroid metabolism
 Isolated 17,20-lyase deficiency
 Combined 17α-hydroxylase/17,20-lyase deficiency
 17β-Hydroxysteroid dehydrogenase III deficiency
 Androgen insensitivity syndrome

References

External links 

Autosomal recessive disorders
Endocrine gonad disorders
Gonadotropin-releasing hormone and gonadotropins
Rare diseases
Syndromes
Intersex variations